The Northern California Open is a golf tournament played in the Northern California, open to both amateur and professional golfers. It is run by the Northern California section of the PGA of America. It has been played annually since 1920 at a variety of courses around the state. It was considered a PGA Tour event in the 1920s.

Winners

2021 David Laskin
2020 Jonathan De Los Reyes
2019 Don Leafstrand
2018 Cody Blick
2017 Adam Stone
2016 Gregor Main
2015 Xander Schauffele
2014 Kyle Souza
2013 John Jackson
2012 Anthony Verna
2011 Jeff Rangel
2010 Ryan Thornberry
2009 Todd Fischer
2008 Boyd Summerhays
2007 Matt Bettencourt
2006 Gundy Jones
2005 Robert Hamilton
2004 John Ellis
2003 Matt Bettencourt
2002 Matt Bettencourt
2001 Brad Martin
2000 Shawn Kelly
1999 Casey Boyns
1998 Jon Chaffee
1997 Jon Chaffee
1996 Patrick Boyd
1995 Shawn Kelly
1994 Eric Buckelew
1993 Todd Spain
1992 Ron Parsons
1991 Chris Holzgang
1990 David Sutherland
1989 Jeff Wilson
1988 Dale Riley
1987 Joey Rassett
1986 Mark Blakely
1985 Joey Rassett
1984 Bill Glasson
1983 Jim Kane
1982 Bob Boldt
1981 Mike Brannan
1980 Pat McGowan
1979 Brent Bonino
1978 Ray Arinno
1977 Rick Rhoads
1976 Peter Jacobsen
1975 Ray Arinno
1974 Bruce Summerhays
1973 Roger Maltbie
1972 Ken Towns
1971 Vic Loustalot
1970 Sandy Galbraith
1969 David Barber
1968 Jerry Heard
1967 George Archer
1966 Dick Lotz
1965 John McMullin
1964 George Archer
1963 George Archer
1962 Tony Lema
1961 Alex Sutton
1960 Tal Smith
1959 No tournament
1958 Dick Knight
1957 Joe Greer
1956 Bud Ward
1955 Smiley Quick
1954 George Schneiter
1953 Eric Monti
1952 Dutch Harrison
1951 Bud Ward
1950 Charles Seaver
1949 Art Bell
1948 Bill Nary
1947 Tal Smith
1946 Charles R. Sheppard
1945 Jim Ferrier
1944 Jim Ferrier
1943 Art Bell
1942 Harry Bassler
1941 Mark Fry
1940 Mark Fry
1939 Charles R. Sheppard
1938 No tournament
1937 Harry Bassler
1936 Willie Goggin
1935 Willie Goggin
1934 Lawson Little
1933 Ben F. Coltrin
1932 Charles R. Sheppard
1931 Charles R. Sheppard
1927–30 No tournament
1926 Frank Minch
1925 No tournament
1924 Macdonald Smith
1923 Harold Sampson
1922 Jock Hutchison
1921 Eddie Loos
1920 John Black

References

External links
PGA of America - Northern California section
List of winners

Former PGA Tour events
Golf in California
PGA of America sectional tournaments
Recurring sporting events established in 1920
1920 establishments in California